Sandrine Josso (born 19 September 1975) is a French politician who has been serving as a member of the French National Assembly since the 2017 elections, representing the department of Loire-Atlantique.

In parliament, Josso served on the Committee on Social Development and Spatial Planning from 2017 until 2019 before moving to the Committee on Cultural Affairs and Education.

From 2017 until 2019, Josso was a member of La République En Marche! (LREM) and therefore part of its parliamentary group. She quit the LREM group and joined the Liberties and Territories group in 2019. She was one of the founding members of The New Democrats in 2020.
She then moved to the MoDem group in 2020.

See also
 2017 French legislative election

References

Living people
Deputies of the 15th National Assembly of the French Fifth Republic
La République En Marche! politicians
New Democrats politicians
Democratic Movement (France) politicians
21st-century French women politicians
Place of birth missing (living people)
Women members of the National Assembly (France)
1975 births
Members of Parliament for Loire-Atlantique